Synagogues of the Swabian type are former synagogues built between 1780 and 1820 in Swabia, Bavaria. They were handsome synagogues of a specific style, reflecting the growing self-confidence and the increased acceptance of the Jews of Swabia in the 18th century.

History 

In the Middle Ages, the Jews in Germany have been expelled from the cities to the countryside and to the margins of society. Therefore, they have settled usually isolated and sporadic. There has been no considerable Jewish community life anymore. Not earlier than at the end of the 16th century there has been again signs of a Jewish reorganization. Jews have begun to re-establish Jewish communities in the villages and have started to build synagogues. In Swabia, this was happening faster, than elsewhere in Germany. The synagogues became more and more handsome. Between 1780 and 1820 it developed its own Swabian style of synagogues, inspired by the Empire style. The following former synagogues are examples for this specific Swabian style. All of them have been plundered and vandalized 1938 during Kristallnacht. The use of the buildings as synagogues was thus ended.

Synagogue of Wallerstein 
This synagogue was built between 1805 and 1807 in Wallerstein. 1938 the Nazis vandalized it and used it later as warehouse. Today, there is a bank in the building.

Synagogue of Ichenhausen 
This synagogue was built in 1781 in Ichenhausen. In 1938 it has been vandalized and later used as a warehouse for the Wehrmacht. From 1958 to 1985 the municipality used the building as a fire station. Thanks to the Aktionskreis Synagoge Ichenhausen e. V. the synagogue has been authentically restored from 1984 to 1987. Today, it's a "House of Encounter". On the upper floor, there is a permanent exhibition about Judaism in the Swabian countryside.

Synagogue of Hürben, Krumbach 
This synagogue was built in 1818 in Hürben, which now is part of Krumbach. It is very similar to the synagogue of Ichenhausen. The synagogue has been vandalized in 1938, burnt down in 1939 and demolished by the Nazis in 1942.

Synagogue of Illereichen, Altenstadt 
This synagogue was built in 1802/03 in Illereichen, the former name of Altenstadt. In 1938 the synagogue has been vandalized and in 1955 demolished.

References

Further reading 
 Benigna Schönhagen (eds.): „Ma Tovu…". Wie schön sind deine Zelte, Jakob. Synagogen in Schwaben, München 2014, 208 Seiten, 
 Michael Brenner, Sabine Ullmann (dds.): Die Juden in Schwaben. Berlin/Boston 2013.

External links 
 Website of „Alemannia Judaica“ (German)

Former synagogues in Germany
Synagogues
Swabia (Bavaria)